The Schmidt–Rubin rifles were a series of Swiss Army service rifles in use between 1889 and 1958. They are distinguished by the straight-pull bolt action invented by Rudolf Schmidt and use Eduard Rubin's 7.5×55mm Schmidt–Rubin rifle cartridge.

Models

Schmidt–Rubin 1889

The Model 1889 was the first in the series of Schmidt–Rubin rifles which served Switzerland from 1889 to 1953. The rifle takes its name from the designer of its action, Colonel Rudolf Schmidt, and the designer of its ammunition, Colonel Eduard Rubin. Production of the rifle began in 1891. The straight-pull bolt action allows the user to pull the bolt straight back to unlock the action, cock the striker, extract, and eject the spent cartridge in one motion, and then push the bolt forward to chamber a round and lock the action. This is as opposed to a traditional bolt action, wherein the user must lift the bolt handle to unlock the action before pulling the bolt back. The rifle is roughly musket length with a free-floating barrel, 12-round magazine and wood stock that extends almost to the tip of the barrel. The Schmidt–Rubin 1889 was an advanced weapon for its time.
The Schmidt–Rubin 1889 was one of the first rifles to use copper-jacketed ammunition as its standard ammunition. The GP90 7.5×53.5mm round designed by Col. Rubin in 1882 was revolutionary in that most of the bullets used in Europe at the time, except for the Mle 1886 Lebel rifle metal-jacketed 8mm bullet, were around .45 caliber, as opposed to the .308 caliber of the Schmidt–Rubin ammunition. The round was "paper patched", meaning that the bullet was surrounded by a piece of paper, much like the cotton patches placed around a musket ball. Paper patching the round was supposed to aid in the lubrication of the bullet. In 1923, long after the discontinuation of the Model 1889, the GP90/23 7.5×54.5mm round was produced without the paper patching. The Model 1889 was eventually replaced by its successor models, including the Model 1896, Model 96/11, Model 1911, Model 1911 carbine, and the famous K-31.

Schmidt-Rubin model 1889/96
The Schmidt–Rubin Model 1889/96 was the replacement for the 1889. The biggest change was moving the locking lugs from the rear of the bolt sleeve to the front of the bolt sleeve. This allowed the receiver to be shortened by a small amount. In addition, the change allowed the bolt and receiver to handle more pressure. Colonel Schmidt was asked to do this for the model 1889, but refused, claiming it was not possible. Colonel Vogelsgang and his assistant Rebholz worked out the details which were not complex but did require time to retool. The rifle system was adopted in 1896. As such, this and subsequent versions should probably be known more as Vogelsgang-Rebholz rifles, rather than Schmidt–Rubin. When the cartridge was modified in 1911 to increase the velocity of the bullet, the 1896 bolt system was used.  Almost all the model 89/96 rifles were converted to 96/11. Only a few remain in the original configuration and almost all of those are private series rifles that were never military issue.

Schmidt-Rubin Model 1897 cadet rifle
The Schmidt–Rubin Model 1897 cadet rifle was intended as a replacement for the earlier Vetterli rifles. The Model 97 rifles were single shot using the bolt mechanism of the Schmidt–Rubin Model 89/96 rifle. It was to use a reduced power GP90 7.5×53.5mm 
cartridge for the smaller younger cadets. The rifles sights were graduated both for the light and the standard loads. There were approximately 7900 of the cadet rifles made.

Model 1899/1900 short rifle
The model 1899/1900 short rifle was an answer to a call for a short rifle that would replace the unpopular Model 1893 Manlicher straight pull action Carbine. The 99/00 short rifle was meant to be used by the artillery and other rear echelon troops. Design began February 27, 1900, and production began in 1901 and lasted for 10 years (18,750 were made). It was issued to fortress troops, artillerymen, bicycle troops, and balloon companies. The model 99/00 short rifle can be fitted with Model 1889/92 bayonet and the Model 1906 bayonet. Most of the 99/00 and later 1905 short rifles were converted to model K11 carbines when the GP11 cartridge was adopted. Very few unconverted rifles exist today.

Schmidt-Rubin 1896/11 rifle
The Schmidt–Rubin 1896/11 rifle, or the Model 96/11, was Switzerland's effort to upgrade the 89/96 rifles it had on hand to use the more powerful cartridge adopted as the GP11. The GP11 cartridge operated at a higher chamber pressure, which the 89/96 action could easily handle. Because of this, the model 89/96 rifles were modernized by changing the 3 groove rifled barrel to a new 4-groove type, adding a pistol grip to the stock, changing the magazine to the 6-round type used in the 1900 short rifle, and changing the sights to a more modern type. The changes streamlined the appearance of the rifles. Because more rifles were needed than were available, the model 1911 rifle was put into production with slight changes. Almost all of the 127,000-plus model 89/96 rifles were converted to the 96/11 specifications.

Model 1911 rifle

An improvement over the original 1889 version of the Schmidt–Rubin rifle, the Swiss M1911 placed the locking lugs in the middle of the bolt, rather than at the rear, strengthening the action and allowing a more powerful cartridge, the Gewehrpatrone 11 or GP 11 to be used. It is distinguished from the 96/11 rifle by a curved buttplate and by a stock with an integral semi-pistol grip.  It uses a graduated tangent sight which begins at 300 meters.  The 1911 and 96/11 rifles are characterized by exceptional accuracy and were made with excellent craftsmanship.  The fact that Switzerland remained neutral through both world wars ensured that they are in far better condition, on average, than the rifles of other European nations from that vintage.

Model 1911 carbine ("K11") 
The Swiss at some point realized that its support troops, cavalry, and certain other units required a shorter rifle than what was currently available and so designed the Model 1911 carbine. The Swiss 1911 carbine being smaller, lighter and still lethally accurate, it became a favorite of the Swiss Army and its popularity contributed to the design of its successor the K31. Production of the K11 included conversion of the model 1900 and 1905 short rifles to the newer specifications of the carbine. For this reason the earlier short rifles are rarely found in their original state. The K11 was the last of the Vogelsgang/Rebholz rifles to be produced.

Other models
Other models include:

 K31 carbine, a significant later development
 Model 1905 carbine
 ZfK31/42 and /43
Z fK55 sniper rifle

References

External links
  Swiss Rifles
 

7.5×55mm Swiss firearms
Early rifles
Rifles of Switzerland
Straight-pull rifles